Stan Turner was the main anchor at KSTP-TV Minneapolis/St. Paul during the 1980s.  Prior to joining KSTP-TV in 1968, Turner had worked at both KDWB-AM and KSTP-AM.  In 1989 Turner became main anchor at KSTP-TV's parent company Hubbard Broadcasting's All News Channel a position he held until the channel went off the air in 2002.

From 2004-11 Stan was news director, reporter, and newscaster with the MNN Radio Network.  In 2009 Stan Turner was inducted into the Pavek Museum of Broadcasting's Hall of Fame.

External links 
 Pavek Museum of Broadcasting Hall of Fame: Stan Turner

Year of birth missing (living people)
Living people
Television in Minnesota
Television anchors from Minneapolis–Saint Paul, Minnesota